South China is a geographical and cultural region that covers the southernmost part of China. Its precise meaning varies with context. A notable feature of South China in comparison to the rest of China is that most of its citizens are not native speakers of Standard Chinese. Cantonese is the most common language in the region while the Guangxi region contains the largest concentration of China's ethnic minorities.

Administrative divisions

Cities with urban area over one million in population
Provincial capitals in bold.

Namesake 
 South China tiger (southern China)
 South China Morning Post (Hong Kong, South China)
 Huanan Seafood Wholesale Market (Wuhan, Central China)

See also 
 Lingnan
 List of regions of China
 Southern China
 South Central China — includes South China and "Central China" provincial-level subdivisions.

References

External links 

 
Regions of China